Shondrae Crawford, also known as Bangladesh, is an American producer, songwriter, producer, disk jockey, and rapper, best known for his production and songwriting work with Ludacris, Lil Wayne ("A Milli"), Beyoncé ("Video Phone" & "Diva", Mario ("Break Up"), and Rihanna ("Cockiness (Love It)"). A Two-time Grammy nominee, Crawford has also worked with Usher, Nicki Minaj, Brandy, and Ciara, among others. He is also credited as an early mentor of fellow Midwestern producer Harv.

In 2010, Crawford sued Lil' Wayne over unpaid royalties stemming from hit "A Milli", and the lawsuit was settled amicably in 2012. He subsequently created his own label, Bangladesh Records, in 2015.

Songwriting and production credits

Credits are courtesy of Discogs, Tidal, Apple Music, and AllMusic.

Guest appearances

Awards and nominations

References 

African-American songwriters
African-American record producers
1978 births
Living people